Hezarmasjed Rural District is a rural district (dehestan) in the Central District of Kalat County, Razavi Khorasan province, Iran. At the 2006 census, its population was 6,010, in 1,428 families.  The rural district has 16 villages.

References 

Rural Districts of Razavi Khorasan Province
Kalat County